Givanildo is a given name. It may refer to:

 Givanildo Oliveira (born 1948), Brazilian former footballer and manager
 Givanildo Vieira de Souza (born 1986), commonly known as Hulk, Brazilian footballer
 Givanildo Santana do Nascimento, known as Giva Santana, Brazilian mixed martial artist
 Givanildo Pulgas da Silva (born 1993), known as Giva, Brazilian footballer